Peristernia chlorostoma is a species of sea snail, a marine gastropod mollusk in the family Fasciolariidae, the spindle snails, the tulip snails and their allies.

Description
The length of the shell attains 20.5 mm.

Distribution
This marine species occurs Hawaii, the Philippines, Cook Islands, Midway, the Mariana Islands and New Caledonia.

References

 Dautzenberg P. (1929). Contribution à l'étude de la faune de Madagascar: Mollusca marina testacea. Faune des colonies françaises, 3(4): 321-636, pls 4-7. Société d'Editions géographiques, maritimes et coloniales, Paris
 Severns, M. (2011). Shells of the Hawaiian Islands - The Sea Shells. Conchbooks, Hackenheim. 564 pp.

External links
 Sowerby I, G. B. (1825). A catalogue of the shells contained in the collection of the late Earl of Tankerville: arranged according to the Lamarckian conchological system: together with an appendix, containing descriptions of many new species- London, vii + 92 + xxxiv pp
 Reeve, L. A. (1847). Monograph of the genus Turbinella. In: Conchologia Iconica, or, illustrations of the shells of molluscous animals, vol. 4, pl. 1-13 and unpaginated text. L. Reeve & Co., London
 Kiener L.C. 1840-1841. Spécies général et iconographie des coquilles vivantes. Vol. 6. Famille des Canalifères. Deuxième partie. Genres Pyrule (Pyrula), Lamarck, pp. 1-34
 Adams, A. (1855). Description of twenty-seven new species of shells from the collection of Hugh Cuming, Esq. Proceedings of the Zoological Society of London. (1854) 22: 311-317

Fasciolariidae
Gastropods described in 1825